"Flying" is the fifth single by Liverpool britpop band Cast, fronted by ex the La's bassist John Power. The song was released as a standalone single on 12 October 1996 and reached number four on the UK Singles Chart, becoming the band's highest-charting single in the UK. The song was later included on the deluxe re-issue of Cast's debut album, All Change, in 2010.

Track listings

UK CD single
 "Flying"
 "Between the Eyes"
 "For So Long"
 "Walkaway" (live – Feil Festival)

UK 7-inch and cassette single
A1. "Flying"
B1. "Between the Eyes"
B2. "For So Long"

German CD single
 "Flying"
 "For So Long"

Japanese CD single
 "Flying"
 "Between the Eyes"
 "For So Long"
 "Finetime" (live)
 "Four Walls" (live)
 "Alright"

Personnel
Cast
 John Power – vocals, guitar
 Peter Wilkinson – backing vocals, bass
 Liam "Skin" Tyson – guitar
 Keith O'Neill – drums

Production
 Brendan Lynch – producer
 Mark "Spike" Stent – mixing
 Max Heyes – engineer

Charts

References

1996 singles
1996 songs
Cast (band) songs
Polydor Records singles
Song recordings produced by Brendan Lynch (music producer)
Songs written by John Power (musician)